This is a partial list of islands of India. There are a total of 1,382 islands (including uninhabited ones) in India.

Andaman and Nicobar Islands 
The Andaman and Nicobar Islands are a group of 572 islands of Bengal and Andaman Sea.

Andaman Islands

 Great Andaman Islands
 North Andaman Island
 Cleugh Passage Group
 Landfall Island
 East Island
West Island
 Aerial Bay Islands
 Smith Island
 Pocock Island
 Tatle Island
 Stewart Sound Group
  Sound Island
 Swamp Island
 Stewart Island
 Curlew Island
 Aves Island
 Karlo Island
 Interview Group
 Interview Island
 Anderson Island
 Murga Island
 South Reef Island
 Bennett Island
 Middle Andaman Island
 Baratang Island
 East Baratang Group
 Long Island
 Strait Island
 North Passage Island
 Colebrooke Island
 Porlob Island
 West Baratang Group
 Bluff Island
 Spike Island
 Talakaicha Island
 Boning Island
 Belle Island
 South Andaman Island
 Napier Bay Islands
 James Island
 Kyd Island
 Port Meadows Isle
 Defence Islands
 Defence Island
 Clyde Island
 Port Blair Islands
 Garacharma Island
 Chatham Island
 Netaji Subhas Chandra Bose Island
 Viper Island
 Snake Island
 Rutland Archipelago
 Rutland Island
 Passage Island
 Cinque Islands
 North Cinque Island
 South Cinque Island
 Labyrinth Islands
 Tarmugli Island
 Twin Islands
 The Sisters
 East Sister Island
 West Sister Island
 Little Andaman Group
 Little Andaman Island 
 The Brothers
 North Brother Island
 South Brother Island
 Ritchie's Archipelago
 Button Islands
 North Button Island
 Middle Button Island
 South Button Island
 Outram Island
 Henry Lawrence Island
 John Lawrence Island
 Sir William Peel Island
 Wilson Island
 Nicholson Island
 Swaraj Dweep
 Shaheed Dweep
 Rose Island
 East Volcano Islands
 Barren Island
 Narcondam Island
 Sentinel Islands
 North Sentinel Island
 South Sentinel Island

Nicobar Islands 
Northern Group:
 Car Nicobar
 Battimalv

Central Group:
 Chowra, Chaura or Sanenyo
 Teressa or Luroo
 Bompuka or Poahat
 Katchal
 Camorta
 Trinket
 Nancowry or Nancowrie
 Tillangchong
 Laouk or "Isle of Man"

Southern Group (Sambelong):
 Great Nicobar (largest island of the Nicobars)
 Little Nicobar
 Kondul Island
 Pulo Milo or Pillomilo (Milo Island)
 Meroe 
(There are numerous other minor isles/cays such as Trak, Treis, Menchal, Kabra, Pigeon and Megapod)

Andhra Pradesh
 Bhavani Island
 Diviseema
 Konaseema
 Hope
 Irukkam
 Sriharikota
 Venadu

Assam
 Dibru Saikhowa Island
 Majuli Island
 Umananda Island

Bihar
 Raghopur Diyara Island

Dadra and Nagar Haveli and Daman and Diu
 Diu Island

Goa
Within Bardez sub-district:
 Calvim
 Corjuem
 Raneache Zuem
Within Canacona sub-district:
 Anjediva Island
 Cancona Island
Within Tiswadi sub-district:
 Chorão
 Cumbarjua
 Divar
 St Estevam
 Vanxim
Within Mormugão sub-district:
 Ilha de Grande
 Ilha de Pequeño
 São Jacinto
 Ilha de São Jorge

Gujarat
 Bet Dwarka
 Gangto Bet Island
 Islands of the Gulf of Kutch
 Islands of Eastern Indus Delta
 Kutch Island'''
 Nanda Bet Islnand
 Piram Island
 Pirotan Island
 Shiyalbet Island

Jammu and Kashmir
 Char Chinar (Ropa Lank)
 Zainul Lank

Karnataka
 St. Mary's Islands
 Basavaraj Durga Island
 Kurumgad Island
 Netrani Island
 Nisargadhama
 Pavoor Uliya
 Srirangapatna
 Uppinakudru

Kerala
 Chavara Thekkumbhagom
 Dharmadam Island
 Edayilakkad
 Ezhumanthuruthu
 Gundu Island
 Kavvayi Islands
 Kothad
 Kuruvadweep
 Moolampilly Island
 Munroe Island
 Nedungad
 Panangad, Kochi
 Parumala
 Pathiramanal
 Pizhala
 Poochakkal
 Pulinkunnoo
 Ramanthuruth
 Sathar Island
 Vallarpadam
 Venduruthy
 Vypin
 Willingdon Island

Lakshadweep
Lakshadweep is an archipelago of twelve atolls, three reefs and five submerged banks, with a total of about thirty-nine islands and islets.

Aminidivi Islands
 Amini Island
 Bitrā Island
 Byramgore
 Chetlat Island
 Cherbaniani
 Kadmat Island
 Kiltān Island
 Perumal Par

Laccadive Islands
 Agatti Island
 Androth Island
 Bangaram Island
 Kalpeni Island
 Kavaratti Island
 Pitti Island
 Suheli Par
 Kalpatti Island

Minicoy Island
 Minicoy Island
 Viringili Island

Maharashtra
 Ambu Island
 Butcher Island
 Cross Island
 Elephanta Island
Gowalkot
 Hog Island, Mumbai
 Khanderi Island
 Madh Island
 Marve Island
 Middle Ground Isle
 Murud-Janjira
 Oyster Rock
 Panju Island
 Salsette Island
 Sinoy Hill Island
 Suvarnadurg Island
 Underi Island
 Yeshwantgad Island

Seven Islands of Mumbai
 Isle of Mumbai
 Colaba Island
 Old Woman's Island
 Mahim Island
 Mazagaon Island
 Parel Island
 Worli Island

Manipur
 Keibul Lamjao Island
 Floating Islands (Phumdi)

Meghalaya

 Nongkhnum River Island

Odisha
 Abdul Kalam Island (Wheeler Island)
 Cattle Island
 Hukitola
 Kalijai Island
 Kanika Sands
 Nalbana Island
 Parikud Island

Tamil Nadu
 Hare Island (Muyal Theevu)
 Krusadai Island
 Nallathanni Theevu
 Pamban Island
 Pullivasal Island
 Srirangam Island
 Upputanni Island
 Vivekananda Rock
 Quibble Island
 Kattupalli Island
 The Island, Chennai
 Vaalai Theevu, Kilakarai Tamil Nadu
 Appa Theevu, Kilakarai, Tamil Nadu
 Whale Island, Chennai
 Battle of Adyar Island, Chennai

West Bengal

 Bhutni Island

Sundarbans
 Bakkhali Island
 Bhangduni (Bob) Island
 Dalhousie Island
 Ghoramara Island
 Gosaba Island
 Haliday Island
 Henry Island
 Jambudwip
 Kakdwip
 Lohachara island
 Lothian Island
 Marichjhanpi
 Mousuni Island
 Namkhana island
 Nayachar island
 New Moore island
 Patharpratima island
 Sagar island
 Tin Kona island

References

India, List of islands of
Lists
Islands

pl:Indie#Wyspy